Ire or IRE may refer to:

Ire
 Extreme anger; intense fury
 Irē, the Livonian name for Mazirbe, Latvia
 A town in Oye, Nigeria
 Ire (album), a 2015 album by the Australian metalcore band Parkway Drive
 Ire (Iliad), a town mentioned in the Iliad
 Ire, another name of Eira (Messenia), a fortress town of ancient Messenia

IRE
 an abbreviation of Ireland, usually referring to the island of Ireland or bodies that represent it
 Institute of Radio Engineers
 Institute of the Regions of Europe, a European research institute
 Investigative Reporters and Editors
 Ireland, UNDP country code
 Iron Realms Entertainment
 Iron response element, a regulatory RNA sequence
 Irreversible electroporation, a medical soft tissue ablation method
 IRE (unit), a unit used to measure amplitude of composite video signals
 Interregio-Express
 Institute for Regional Education, the organization responsible for producing the Qatsi trilogy
 Imperial Rescript on Education, a rescript signed by Emperor Meiji of Japan on 30 October 1890 to articulate government policy on the guiding principles of education on the Empire of Japan.